The Katrina McClain Award is an award presented annually to the best women's basketball power forward in the National Collegiate Athletic Association (NCAA) Division I competition. It is named after Hall of Famer Katrina McClain-Pittman, a two-time USA Basketball Female Athlete of the Year with two Olympic gold, one Olympic bronze, and three FIBA World Championships medals. McClain was the WBCA National Player of the Year in her senior season at Georgia. 

The Katrina McClain Award was first presented in 2018, when WBCA and the Naismith Hall, in collaboration with ESPN, incorporated the Nancy Lieberman Award, presented since 2000 to the top NCAA women's point guard, into a new set of awards known as the "Naismith Starting Five". All five awards are presented at the WBCA convention (except in 2020, when the convention was not held due to the coronavirus pandemic) to players at each of the five traditional basketball positions. These awards parallel a previously existing set of men's basketball positional awards also presented by the Hall. In addition to the Lieberman Award, the other three new awards are:
 Ann Meyers Drysdale Shooting Guard Award
 Cheryl Miller Small Forward Award
 Lisa Leslie Center Award

Winner for each of the Starting Five awards is determined by a selection committee consisting of Hall of Famers, WBCA coaching members, and media, and headed by the award's namesake. Fan voting through the Hall's website is also incorporated into the selection process.

Key

Winners

Winners by school

See also
Karl Malone Award – the counterpart to the McClain Award; given to the best men's NCAA power forward

References

External links
Official website

College basketball player of the year awards in the United States
College basketball trophies and awards in the United States
College women's basketball in the United States
Sports awards honoring women
Awards established in 2018
College sports trophies and awards in the United States